Eagle Tavern may refer to:

Eagle Tavern (Eagle, Pennsylvania), a historic tavern in Pennsylvania
Eagle Tavern (Dover, Delaware), listed on the National Register of Historic Places in Kent County, Delaware
Eagle Tavern (Watkinsville, Georgia), listed on the National Register of Historic Places in Oconee County, Georgia
Eagle Tavern (Trenton, New Jersey), listed on the National Register of Historic Places in Mercer County, New Jersey
Eagle Tavern (Halifax, North Carolina), listed on the National Register of Historic Places in Halifax County, North Carolina
Eagle Tavern (Upper Makefield Township, Pennsylvania), listed on the National Register of Historic Places in Bucks County, Pennsylvania